Grady Cavness (born March 1, 1947) is a former American football defensive back. He played for the Denver Broncos in 1969 and for the Atlanta Falcons in 1970. He later joined the CFL and played for the Winnipeg Blue Bombers from 1972 to 1973 and for the BC Lions from 1974 to 1978.

References

1947 births
Living people
American football defensive backs
UTEP Miners football players
Denver Broncos players
Atlanta Falcons players
Winnipeg Blue Bombers players
BC Lions players